Francis Clerke may refer to:

Francis Clerke (lawyer) (fl. 1594), English lawyer
Francis Clerke (politician, died 1686) (c. 1624–1686), English politician, MP for Rochester
Francis Clerke (politician, died 1715) (c. 1655–1715), English politician, MP for Oxfordshire
Francis Clerke (politician, died 1691) (c. 1665–1691), English politician, MP for Rochester
Sir Francis Clerke, 6th Baronet (1682–1769), of the Clerke baronets, Gentleman Usher
Sir Francis Clerke, 7th Baronet (1748–1778), aide-de-camp to General John Burgoyne, killed at Saratoga

See also
Francis Clark (disambiguation)
Frank Clarke (disambiguation)